Dexter–Huron Metropark is a  park on the Huron River in the Huron-Clinton system of metro parks. The park has three picnic areas, a children's play area, a softball diamond, fishing, and  canoe launching. A Metropark daily or annual vehicle permit is required for entry. The park will eventually be linked to Hudson Mills Metropark and Delhi Metropark via the Border-to-Border Trail.

References

External links
 Huron-Clinton Metroparks
 U.S. Geological Survey Map at the U.S. Geological Survey Map Website. Retrieved November 16th, 2022.

Huron–Clinton Metroparks
Protected areas of Washtenaw County, Michigan
Huron River (Michigan)